The 2017 Holiday Bowl was a postseason college football bowl game, played at SDCCU Stadium in San Diego, California, on December 28, 2017. This was the first time that the Holiday Bowl was played at SDCCU Stadium. Previous to the 2017 season, the Holiday Bowl was played at Qualcomm Stadium. The 40th edition of the Holiday Bowl featured the Washington State Cougars of the Pac-12 Conference versus the Michigan State Spartans of the Big Ten Conference.  It was one of the 2017–18 bowl games concluding the 2017 FBS football season. Sponsored by San Diego County Credit Union, the game was officially known as the San Diego County Credit Union Holiday Bowl.

Teams

Washington State 

This was Washington State's fourth appearance in the Holiday Bowl, having lost to #14 Brigham Young in 1981, having defeated #5 Texas in 2003, and having lost to Minnesota in 2016.  The Cougars finished the 2017 regular season at 9–3, and were third in the Pac-12 North Division (6–3). The season featured wins against then-#5 USC and then-#18 Stanford.

Michigan State 

This was Michigan State's first appearance in a Holiday Bowl. The Spartans finished the 2017 regular season at 9–3, and were second in the B1G East Division (7–2). The team had upset wins over then-#7 Michigan and then-#7 Penn State. Their three losses were all against teams that finished in the AP Top 20 (#14 Notre Dame, #20 Northwestern and #5 Ohio State).

Game summary

Scoring summary

Statistics

References

Holiday Bowl
Holiday Bowl
Washington State Cougars football bowl games
Michigan State Spartans football bowl games
Holiday Bowl
December 2017 sports events in the United States